Wing Commander Andrew Duncan Green  (born 30 July 1962) is a retired British Royal Air Force fighter pilot and world land speed record holder since 1997, the first land speed record to break the sound barrier.

Early life 
He was born in Atherstone, Warwickshire. Green's family moved to Hartlepool in the 1970s when his father was appointed station manager for the local fire brigade. Green originally attended High Tunstall School before moving to Marske-by-the-Sea and beginning study at Bydales Comprehensive School. Green later moved to Kent with his family, where he studied at St Olave's Grammar School in Orpington. While at a car show in Hartlepool at a young age, Green decided that he would be interested in a career within the military.

RAF career
Green gained an RAF scholarship to Worcester College, Oxford, where he graduated in 1983 with first class honours in mathematics. Later that year Green was promoted from acting Pilot Officer to substantive Pilot Officer in the RAF. He qualified as a fighter pilot on F-4 Phantom and Tornado F3 aircraft.  In 2003 Green was promoted to Wing Commander. He later became Officer Commanding Operations Wing at RAF Wittering near Peterborough. Green was the captain of the RAF team at the Cresta Run, where he used an experimental French toboggan.

In his capacity as an RAF officer, he has served in East Germany, Iraq, Bosnia and Afghanistan.

Speed records

Supersonic
Green is the current holder of the World Land speed record, and the first person to break the sound barrier on land. On 15 October 1997, 50 years and 1 day after the sound barrier was broken in aerial flight by Chuck Yeager, Green reached , the first supersonic record (Mach 1.016). His call sign was "Dead Dog". As the vehicle crossed the speed of sound it created a sonic boom.

Green is now working on a new record attempt to break the  mark with Bloodhound LSR.

Road car
His next land speed attempt was intended to be for MG in a specially modified MG F called the MG EX255; however, due to the time required for modifications, the project did not finish on time and that attempt never happened.

Diesel power

Honours and awards
He was appointed an Officer of the Order of the British Empire in the 1998 New Year Honours. He was awarded the Segrave Trophy by the Royal Automobile Club in 1997. In 2006 he was awarded the John Cobb Trophy by the British Racing Drivers' Club for "a success of outstanding character" and an Honorary degree from Staffordshire University in July 2008.

Racing experience
On 14 June 2009 Green gained his first circuit racing experience, whilst raising money for the Bloodhound SSC project, by participating in Round 4 of the Elise Trophy at Snetterton.

See also
List of vehicle speed records

References

External links
European Car Magazine profile

1962 births
Living people
Land speed record people
Royal Air Force wing commanders
Officers of the Order of the British Empire
Segrave Trophy recipients
BRDC Gold Star winners
British motivational speakers
People educated at St Olave's Grammar School
Alumni of Worcester College, Oxford
Bonneville 300 MPH Club members